Ben Shaw is a British house music producer, remixer and DJ, who has released records under his own name, as well as the monikers Sunscape and Gradient.

Biography
His biggest hit single as an artist came in 2001 when "So Strong," a track featuring Adele Holness on vocals, topped the US Billboard Hot Dance Music/Club Play chart.  It peaked at #72 in the UK Singles Chart in July 2001.

References

External links
Official Ben Shaw website

Club DJs
Remixers
British house musicians
Year of birth missing (living people)
Living people